Ismail Easa (born 19 December 1989) is a Maldivian professional footballer who plays as a forward and an attacking midfielder for the Dhivehi Premier League club United Victory and the Maldives national team.

International career
Easa made his debut for the Maldives' senior team in their first match of the 2012 Nehru Cup against Nepal on 23 August 2012, coming on to play in the 73rd minute, replacing Mohamed Umair and also scored his first goal from a through ball from Ahmed Rasheed, in the 77th minute.

Career statistics

International goals

Senior team 

Scores and results list Maldives goal tally first.

References

1989 births
Living people
Maldivian footballers
Maldives international footballers
Victory Sports Club players
New Radiant S.C. players
Association football midfielders
Association football forwards
Footballers at the 2010 Asian Games
Asian Games competitors for the Maldives
T.C. Sports Club players
Club Eagles players